Spodnji Tuštanj is a settlement in the Municipality of Moravče in central Slovenia. The area is part of the traditional region of Upper Carniola. It is now included with the rest of the municipality in the Central Slovenia Statistical Region.

Name
Spodnji Tuštanj was attested in historical sources as Tuftstein in 1260, Taustayn in 1335, Tenztain in 1494, and Twfcstain in 1496, among other spellings.

References

External links
 
Spodnji Tuštanj on Geopedia

Populated places in the Municipality of Moravče